Timino is a rural locality (a selo) in Yusvinsky District, Perm Krai, Russia. The population was 259 as of 2010. There are 10 streets.

Geography 
Timino is located 34 km northeast of Yusva (the district's administrative centre) by road. Ivachevo is the nearest rural locality.

References 

Rural localities in Yusvinsky District